NBA 2K is a 1999 sports video game developed by Visual Concepts and published by Sega Sports. It was initially released for Dreamcast in 1999. Allen Iverson of the Philadelphia 76ers is featured as the cover athlete. The game is based on the National Basketball Association and, as such, allows the player to compete in basketball games with the current NBA season's players and teams. Several game modes are present, including one in which the player can create customizable players. NBA 2K was well-received by critics, who praised it for setting the standard for basketball video games.

Gameplay
NBA 2K, along with the series as a whole, strives to emulate the sport of basketball, more specifically, the National Basketball Association. It features the current players and teams from the 1999–2000 NBA season, and players may use them in several modes. Additionally, the player can create their own players and compile their own teams. The game features commentary from fictional announcers Bob Steele and Rod West (a play on Bob Barker and Rod Roddy, who were then the host and announcer, respectively, on the American game show The Price is Right), who are portrayed by Bob Fitzgerald and Rod Brooks respectively.

Reception

NBA 2K received "favorable" reviews according to the review aggregation website GameRankings. Praise was directed towards the visuals and controls in particular, while criticism was aimed at the lack of all-around polish.

Scott Alan Marriott for AllGame particularly praised the overall visuals and presentation. He called NBA 2K "a sports title that offers the graphics, playability, and artificial intelligence (AI) to convert nearly anyone who remotely enjoys the game of basketball into a hardcore fanatic". Game Informers review, which is credited to Andrew Reiner, Andy McNamara, and Paul Anderson, mostly praised the realistic visuals and presentation. Reiner summarized his thoughts with, "The only complaint I have is the lame free-throw system. The rest of the game is oh so sweet." McNamara stated, "NBA 2K is a solid game with some great play mechanics. I like the play of NBA Live 2000 [...] better, but for graphics alone, I'll probably put more time in on NBA 2K." Lastly, Anderson wrote, "Even though you may initially find a few quirks in the game, the entire package is rock solid."
Ryan MacDonald of GameSpot wrote: "In the end, NBA 2Ks dazzling graphics, superb control, and strong AI make it the most dynamic basketball video game ever. However, Visual Concepts fell just short of delivering the same seamless gameplay of NFL 2K. The game's visuals and control, while both outstanding, just don't have the same cohesion that made NFL 2K so flawless. But even with these few problems, playing NBA 2K will just about ruin you for all other basketball games." Brandon Justice of IGN wrote: "[W]hile the game has issues, it is easily worlds beyond anything else on the market, and truly raises the bar for video game basketball. In fact, I'd go so far as to say that it has done so in such a manner that even the high-jumping designers at Visual Concepts have difficulty clearing their own newfound level of excellence. Many aspects of this game are unbelievable, but it is the type of game that does just as much to open your eyes to the possibilities as it does to blow you away. In the end, we've got one hell of a basketball game, but a game that is far from perfect. While not quite as polished as NFL2K, NBA2K is most certainly a must have title for any sport fan, and is one of the most compelling reasons to own a Dreamcast to date." The Enforcer of GamePro wrote in one review: "If you're crazy into sports, you gotta have NBA 2K. Not only is it the most outstanding-looking sports game of all time, it also plays like a champ. This is where the real showtime is." In another review, Uncle Dust said: "After the massive success of the Dreamcast launch title NFL 2K, Sega Sports is back with a vengeance with NBA 2K. The game features the same ultra-realistic graphics of the pigskin game, but it also throws in some of the most realistic hoops skills ever seen on a console, featuring over 1,300 motion-captured moves. The game also includes playbooks by the actual NBA coaches to make sure each team acts exactly as they do in the real NBA." Chris Slate of NextGen wrote that the game was "easy to pick up and get into, and looks flat-out gorgeous. If you're an NBA fan, this game alone is worth the price of a Dreamcast." In Japan, where the game was ported for release on March 23, 2000, Famitsu gave it a score of 33 out of 40.

The game was a finalist for the "Outstanding Achievement in Visual Engineering" award at the Academy of Interactive Arts & Sciences' 3rd Annual Interactive Achievement Awards, which went to Unreal Tournament.

Notes

References

External links
 

1999 video games
Dreamcast games
Dreamcast-only games
Multiplayer and single-player video games
0
Sega video games
Video games developed in the United States
Video games set in 1999
Video games set in 2000